The Academy Awards pre-show (currently known as The Oscars Red Carpet Show) is a live televised pre-show which precedes the start of the Academy Awards telecast by 90 minutes (previously by 30 minutes until 2011). The pre-show takes place on the red carpet surrounding the theater which holds the telecast, and is almost always hosted by various media personalities, such as Regis Philbin, Chris Connelly, Tim Gunn, and Robin Roberts.

In February 2011, ABC announced that due to the ending of Barbara Walters' Oscar Special, the pre-show would instead take place 90 (rather than 30) minutes before the start time of the Oscar telecast, beginning with the 83rd Academy Awards ceremony.

History 
Beginning with the 1st Academy Awards, there were no Oscar pre-shows. Instead, photographers and interviewers would approach the ceremony's nominees and other attendees as usual. However, these events were neither televised nor heard on the radio prior to the ceremony. In 1979, Regis Philbin officially began the very first red carpet pre-show. However, this event was actually produced by KABC-TV, the ABC O&O station in Los Angeles, and was not broadcast elsewhere. Ten years later, in 1989, both MTV and Movie Time (which became E! a year later) began their red carpet pre-shows with focus on fashion. It would pass another decade, in 1999, when the AMPAS eventually produced its own red carpet pre-show to air on ABC.

Broadcasters such as CNN, E! (under the Live from the Red Carpet banner, which it uses for all major award shows), and Pop have continued to air their own extended red carpet coverage prior to the ceremony. To protect the official telecast, ABC has an exclusive window during the final hour before the ceremony (5:00 p.m. to 6:00 p.m. PT) during which no other broadcaster may broadcast live or newly recorded footage from the red carpet. To comply with this rule, most competing red carpet programs either sign off, or use footage that was recorded earlier. Interviews by other media outlets may continue, but they may not air on television until the end of the window.

Hosts 
The pre-show usually employs the use of recent TV or media personalities as the hosts, who interview the nominees and attendees and sometimes introduce special segments in the moments preceding the ceremony. Below is a listing of the hosts of the pre-show since the 74th Academy Awards ceremony held in 2002.

 2002
 Chris Connelly
 Leeza Gibbons
 Ananda Lewis

 2003
 Jann Carl
 Chris Connelly
 Shaun Robinson

 2004
 Billy Bush
 Chris Connelly
 Maria Menounos

 2005
 Billy Bush
 Jann Carl
 Chris Connelly
 Shaun Robinson

 2006
 Billy Bush
 Chris Connelly
 Cynthia Garrett
 Vanessa Lachey

 2007
 Chris Connelly
 Lisa Ling
 André Leon Talley
 Allyson Waterman

 2008
 Regis Philbin
 Shaun Robinson
 Samantha Harris

 2009
 Tim Gunn
 Robin Roberts
 Jess Cagle

 2010
 Jess Cagle
 Kathy Ireland
 Sherri Shepherd

 2011
 Tim Gunn
 Maria Menounos
 Robin Roberts
 Krista Smith

 2012
 Jess Cagle
 Nina Garcia
 Tim Gunn
 Robin Roberts
 Louise Roe

 2013
 Kristin Chenoweth
 Kelly Rowland
 Lara Spencer
 Robin Roberts
 Jess Cagle

 2014
 Jess Cagle
 Lara Spencer
 Robin Roberts
 Tyson Beckford

 2015
 Jess Cagle
 Robin Roberts
 Lara Spencer
 Michael Strahan
 Joe Zee

 2016
 Jess Cagle
 Amy Robach
 Robin Roberts
 Lara Spencer
 Michael Strahan
 Joe Zee

 2017
 Jess Cagle
 Robin Roberts
 Michael Strahan
 Lara Spencer
 Nina Garcia
 Krista Smith

 2018
 Michael Strahan
 Wendi McLendon-Covey
 Sara Haines
 Krista Smith
 Dave Karger

 2019
 Ashley Graham
 Maria Menounos
 Elaine Welteroth
 Billy Porter
 Ryan Seacrest

 2020
 Lily Aldridge
 Tamron Hall
 Elvis Mitchell
 Billy Porter
 Ryan Seacrest

 2021
 Ariana DeBose
 Lil Rel Howery

 2022
 Vanessa Hudgens
 Terrence J
 Brandon Maxwell
 Sofia Carson
 Dave Karger

 2023
 Vanessa Hudgens
 Ashley Graham
 Lilly Singh
 Reece Feldman
 Rocsi Diaz
 Dave Karger

Title 
The title has changed throughout the years. Most recently, from the 75th Academy Awards until the 78th Academy Awards, the pre-show was titled "Oscar Countdown". The following year, at the 79th Academy Awards, it was titled "Road to the Oscars". At the 80th Academy Awards, 81st Academy Awards, and 82nd Academy Awards, the pre-show was titled "Oscars Red Carpet". Each title used throughout the years has featured the year of the ceremony with it. Since the 83rd Academy Awards, the pre-show has been titled The Oscars Red Carpet Live.

TV Ratings
1990: [Barbara Walters Special: 28.5 million; 8pm]
2002: 26 million (8pm) [Barbara Walters Special: 17 million; 7pm]
Oscar Countdown 2003 (March): 19.5 (7:30pm) [ABC News Special: 11.4 million; 7pm]
Oscar Countdown 2004: 17.3 rating (8pm) [Barbara Walters Special: 8.9 rating; 7pm]
Oscar Countdown 2005: 27.7 million viewers (8pm)
2007: 27.1 million (8pm) [Barbara Walters Special: 14.5 million; 7pm]
2008: 21.5 million (8pm) [Barbara Walters Special: 11.7 million; 7pm]
2009: 24.4 million (8pm) [Barbara Walters Special: 11.5 million; 7pm]
2010 (March): 25.3 million (8pm) [Barbara Walters Special: 15 million; 7pm] 
2011: 26.605 million (8pm) 
2012: 12.6 (7pm); 16.6 million (7:30pm); 24.1 million (8pm)  
2013: 12.4 million (7pm); 16.5 million (7:30pm); 25.5 million (8pm) 
2014 (March): 14.8 million (7pm); 18.7 million (7:30pm); 26.9 million (8pm) 
2015: 12.94 million (7pm); 16.93 million (7:30pm); 23.81 million (8pm)

See also 
 List of Academy Awards ceremonies

References 

Pre-show
Events in Los Angeles
Annual events in Los Angeles County, California
American Broadcasting Company original programming